NH 130 may refer to:

 National Highway 130 (India)
 New Hampshire Route 130, United States